Alphonso Sylvester Lisk-Carew (1887–1969) was a Sierra Leone Creole photographer, active from around 1905, to 1920 to 1925.

Life and work 
Alphonso Lisk-Carew founded his business in 1905. His brother Arthur was his assistant. Lisk-Carew advertised as Photographers, importers of photographic materials, stationery, toys, fancy goods, etc., 3 East Brook Lane and 30, corner of Westmoreland and Gloucester Streets Freetown, Sierra Leone. The brothers made photographic trips into the interior of Sierra Leone and also to the Gambia circa 1912. The Lisk-Carew brothers were appointed photographers for the visit of the Duke of Connaught in 1910.

Publications

Publications by Lisk-Carew 
 Souvenir album of Freetown. Freetown, 1910?. by Alphonso and Arthur Lisk-Carew.

Publications about Lisk-Carew 
 Vera Viditz-Ward: "Photography in Sierra Leone, 1850–1918". In: Africa (1987), 57:4, p. 510–518
 Sierra Leone, 1787–1987. Two Centuries of Intellectual Life. Manchester, 1987. (p. 514–516.)  (=Repr. of Africa, 57: 4)

Gallery

References

External links 

 The Sierra Leone Web
 Ross Archive of African Images

Sierra Leone Creole people
1887 births
1969 deaths
Sierra Leonean photographers
20th-century photographers